Tsyganov (masculine) or Tsyganova (feminine) is a Russian language surname derived from the term "tsygan" meaning Gypsy.

The surname may refer to:
Tsyganov
Dimitri Tsyganov (born 1989), Russian ice hockey player
Sergey Tsyganov (born 1992), Russian footballer
Valeri Tsyganov (born 1956), Soviet alpine skier
Viktor Tsyganov (1896–1944), Soviet Lieutenant General

Tsyganova
Monika Tsõganova (born 1969), Estonian chess player
Natalya Tsyganova (born 1971), Ukrainian-Russian middle distance runner
Viktoria Tsyganova, Russian singer 
Please add more names if you know of any.

See also
Tsygan (disambiguation), Russian surname

Russian-language surnames